Castor Raphael Ligallama (born 1 March 1949) is a Tanzanian CCM politician and Member of Parliament for Kilombero constituency in the National Assembly of Tanzania since 2005.

References

Living people
Chama Cha Mapinduzi MPs
Tanzanian MPs 2010–2015
1949 births